The Guadalcanal thrush (Zoothera turipavae) is a species of bird in the family Turdidae. It is endemic to the Solomon Islands. Its natural habitat is subtropical or tropical moist montane forests.

References

Guadalcanal thrush
Birds of Guadalcanal
Endemic fauna of the Solomon Islands
Guadalcanal thrush
Taxonomy articles created by Polbot
Endemic birds of the Solomon Islands